Florida's 73rd House District elects one member of the Florida House of Representatives. 
Its current representative is Republican Tommy Gregory. Prior to the creation of districts in 1967, representatives were elected by county. For a historical roster of representatives before 1967, see the List of members of the Florida House of Representatives from Brevard County, Florida. In 2018, Lieutenant Colonel Tommy Gregory (USAF ret.) defeated Democratic challenger resident Liv Coleman  by 24 points in the heavily Republican district.

Representatives from 1967 to the present

References

73
History of Brevard County, Florida